The 1969 Scotland rugby union tour of Argentina was a series of matches played during the month of September 1969 by Scotland in Argentina. It was also the first tour of a Scottish national side to Argentina.

Despite the fact that Scottish Rugby Union did not consider this match as official test matches, was a real tour of Scottish national side. At those time, was usual for the Scottish Rugby Union to consider official only the match played against the other teams that play Five Nations, Australia, South Africa and New Zealand. Scotland, after a loss in the first test match, won the second and drawn the series.

Match summary
Complete list of matches played by Scotland in Argentina:

 Test matches

Notes

Match details 

Argentina C': A. Pagano (cap.); J. Fiordalisi, G. Pimentel, R. Spagnol, V. Dobarro; F. Forrester, M. Cutler; C. Bori, N. Carbone, J. Borghi; R. Sellarés, R. Castro; H. Incola, J. Dumas, A. Orzábal. 
 Scotland XV: C. Blaikie; M. Smith, C. Rea, J. Murchie, A. Gill; I. Robertson, D. Paterson; J. Telfer (cap.), R. Arneil, W. Lauder; G. Broen, P. Stagg; A. Carmichael, F. Laidlaw, J. Mc Lauchlin. 

 Seleccionado del Interior: A. Rodríguez; O. Oelschagler, R. Tarquini, J. Vera, C. Antoraz; C. Navesi, L. Chacón, E. Vaca Narvaja, J. Ghiringhelli, J. Constante; R. Campra (cap.), M. Senatore; R. Fariello, J. Fradua, G. Ribeca. 
 Scotland XV: C. Blaikie; M. Smith, A. Orr, I. Murchie, W. Steele, B. Laidlaw, J. Ellis; R. Arneil, J. Telfer (cap.), S. Carmichaci; A. Mc Rarg, P. Stagg; J. Mc Lauchlin, D. Deans, N. Suddon. 

Argentina: 15.Dudley Morgan, 14.Marcelo Pascual, 13.Alejandro Travaglini, 12.Arturo Rodriguez Jurado, 11.Mario Walther, 10.Tomas Harris-Smith, 9.Adolfo Etchegaray, 8.Raul Loyola, 7.Hector Silva, 6.Hugo Miguens, 5.Adrian Barone, 4.Aitor Otano (cap), 3.Luis Garcia Yanez, 2.Ricardo Handley, 1.Marcelo Farina
Scotland XV: 15.Colin Blaikie, 14.Mike Smith, 13.Ian Murchie, 12.A.V. Orr, 11.Drew Gill, 10.Ian Robertson, 9.Duncan Paterson, 8.Jim Telfer (cap.), 7.Wilson Lauder, 6.Rodger Arneil, 5.Alastair McHarg, 4.Peter Stagg, 3.Sandy Carmichael, 2.Frank Laidlaw, 1.Ian McLauchlan, 

Rosario RU: J. Seaton; E. España, J. Beni, C. Blanco, A. Quetglas; R. Villavicencio, O. Aletta; J. Imhoff, M. Chesta, J. L. Imhoff; R. Suárez, H. Suárez; F. Lando, R. Seaton, S. Furno. 
 Scotland: C. Blaikie; E. Steele, M. Smith, J. Ellis, A. Orr; B. Laidlaw, D. Paterson; R. Arneil, J. Telfer, W. Lauder; G. Brown, A. Moharg; J. Mc Laughlam, D. Deans, N. Suddon. 

 Argentina B: J. Seaton; N. Pérez, C. Blanco, J. Benzi, J. Otaola; C. Martínez, L. Gradin (cap.); H. Silveyra, M. Chesta, G. Anderson; R. Suárez, L. Varela; R. Casabal, C. Massabó, A. Abella. 
 Scotland XV: C. Blaikie; W. Steele, B. Laidlaw, C. Rea, A. Gill; W. Mac Donald, D. Paterson; R. Arneil (cap.), A. Carmichael, W. Lauder, A. Mc Harg, P. Stagg; J. Mc Lauchlan, F. Laidlaw, N. Suddon 

Argentina: 15.Dudley Morgan, 14.Marcelo Pascual, 13.Alejandro Travaglini, 12.Juan Benzi, 11.Mario Walther, 10.Tomas Harris-Smith, 9.Adolfo Etchegaray, 8.Raul Loyola, 7.Hector Silva, 6.Hugo Miguens, 5.Adrian Barone, 4.Aitor Otano, 3.Luis Garcia Yanez, 2.Ricardo Handley, 1.Marcelo Farina
Scotland XV: 15.Colin Blaikie, 14.Mike Smith, 13.B. Laidlaw, 12.Chris Rea, 11.Billy Steele, 10.Ian Robertson, 9.Duncan Paterson, 8.Jim Telfer, 7.Wilson Lauder, 6.Rodger Arneil, 5.Alastair McHarg, 4.Peter Stagg, 3.Sandy Carmichael, 2.Frank Laidlaw, 1.Ian McLauchlan,

References 

Rugby union tours of Argentina
Scotland national rugby union team tours
Scotland
tour
tour